Kampong Sibut is a village in Temburong District, Brunei, about  from the district town Bangar. The population was 202 in 2016. It is one of the villages within Mukim Amo. The postcode is PD2151.

Facilities 
The construction began in 1993 and completed in the following year. It can accommodate 160 worshippers.

References 

Sibut